Valery Pavlovich Gopin (born 8 May 1964) is a Russian handball player. He became Olympic champion in 1988 with the Soviet Union national handball team, and in 1992 with the Unified Team. He became European champion with the Russia national handball team in 1996.

References

External links

1964 births
Living people
Russian male handball players
Soviet male handball players
Handball players at the 1988 Summer Olympics
Handball players at the 1992 Summer Olympics
Handball players at the 1996 Summer Olympics
Olympic gold medalists for the Soviet Union
Olympic gold medalists for the Unified Team
Olympic handball players of the Soviet Union
Olympic handball players of the Unified Team
Olympic handball players of Russia
Olympic medalists in handball
Medalists at the 1992 Summer Olympics
Medalists at the 1988 Summer Olympics
People from Seltso
Sportspeople from Bryansk Oblast